Demirköprü could refer to the following places in Turkey:

Demirköprü, Antakya, a village in Hatay Province
Demirköprü Dam, a dam in Manisa Province
Demirköprü (bridge), a bridge in Adana